Kameli Ratuvou (born 6 November 1983) is a Fijian rugby union player.

Career
He is currently playing for professional English club, Saracens he joined the squad from Fiji for the 2006/07 season. His usual position is on the wing even though he can also play at centre and fullback. He has just signed a contract to keep him with Saracens until the end of the 2010 season.

Ratuvou is also an international for Fiji, and played for them during the 2006 IRB Pacific 5 Nations, and scored a try in the 24–23 loss against Tonga. He was then selected to play for the Pacific Islanders for the tour of Great Britain. He scored tries in the games against Wales and Scotland.

External links
 Fiji profile
 Saracens profile
 Pacific Islanders profile
 Scrum profile

References

1983 births
People educated at Lelean Memorial School
Fijian rugby union players
Living people
Rugby union centres
Rugby union wings
Saracens F.C. players
Fiji international rugby union players
Pacific Islanders rugby union players
Fijian expatriate rugby union players
Expatriate rugby union players in England
Fijian expatriate sportspeople in England
Fiji international rugby sevens players
Male rugby sevens players
People from Moala Island
I-Taukei Fijian people
Expatriate rugby union players in Italy
Fijian expatriate sportspeople in Italy
Zebre Parma players